Mjini Magharibi Region, Zanzibar Urban West Region or West Zanzibar Region (Mkoa wa Mjini Magharibi in Swahili) is one of the 31 regions of Tanzania. The region is located entirely on the island of Zanzibar and bordered to the west by the Indian Ocean, north by Unguja North Region and the east by Unguja South Region. The region is home to one of the seven World Heritage Sites located in Tanzania, namely; Stonetown of Zanzibar. The regional capital is Zanzibar City. According to the 2012 census, the region has a total population of 593,678.

Administrative divisions

Districts
Mjini Magharibi Region is divided into two districts, each administered by a council:

Constituencies
For parliamentary elections, Tanzania is divided into constituencies. As of the 2010 elections Zanzibar Urban/West Region had nineteen constituencies:

 Amani Constituency (Urban)
 Bububu Constituency (West)
 Chumbuni Constituency (Urban)
 Dimani Constituency (West)
 Dole Constituency (West)
 Fuoni Constituency (West)
 Jang'ombe Constituency (Urban)
 Kiembesamaki Constituency (West)
 Kikwajuni Constituency (Urban)
 Kwahani Constituency (Urban)
 Kwamtipura Constituency (Urban)
 Magogoni Constituency (West)
 Magomeni Constituency (Urban)
 Mfenesini Constituency (West)
 Mji Mkongwe Constituency (Urban)
 Mpendae Constituency (Urban)
 Mtoni Constituency (West)
 Mwanakwerekwe Constituency (West)
 Raha Leo Constituency (Urban)

References

External links

 

 
Regions of Tanzania
Geography of Zanzibar